The Resist Tour (also referred to as Resist Tour) was a concert tour by Dutch symphonic metal band Within Temptation, in support of their seventh album Resist which was released on 1 February 2019. The tour began on 11 October 2018 in Krasnoyarsk, Russia, and visited seventeen countries in Europe. The supporting acts for the first leg were bands Beyond the Black and Ego Kill Talent. For 2019, the band toured North America alongside In Flames and performed at both select European summer festivals and special open air shows with selected guests. The band was scheduled to perform a second round of summer festivals in 2020, but due to the COVID-19 pandemic the festivals had to be cancelled.

Background
At the end of 2017, without any news of a sooner studio release, the band announced that they would be embarking on a new tour on the second half of the following year, with a possible new studio album in sight. Even before the arrival of the new year, a few concerts were already sold out. The tour had been labelled "MMXVIII" at that time, as a reference to the year of 2018 and, only after the announcement of their seventh album Resist, the name was changed to "The Resist Tour" in support of the album. Initially, only club and arena dates throughout Europe were added to the tour, before the band started scheduling dates for some 2019 summer festivals. As lead vocalist Sharon den Adel had been facing personal problems and a writer's block before officially start writing for the album, the band's fate was uncertain at the point and she was unsure to even get back touring after all. When later revealed that the vocalist has also decided to stay more time at home to be more present on her children's life, the touring schedule was elaborated with normally two weeks on tour and two weeks off. At the end of 2018, it was announced a new leg of the tour in North America at the beginning of the following year, with In Flames as special guests and Smash into Pieces as the opening act. The leg will consist of 15 dates, with 12 of them passing through the United States and 3 in Canada. After the North American leg, the band commenced another round of concerts throughout Europe, this time consisting of festival presentations and special concerts at palace gardens. During the 2019 festival season, the band was scheduled for the first time as one of the headliners for the Graspop Metal Meeting, one of the biggest European heavy metal festivals.

Although the album would only be released after the start of the tour, den Adel stated in an interview that some then-unreleased songs were going to be played by the band, allowing people to have a first contact with the record on a live form. The first ones to be played were the single "The Reckoning", "Raise Your Banner", "Endless War", "Supernova", and "Mercy Mirror". After the album was released, the band maintained the five aforementioned songs on the setlist. At a certain point of the North American leg, they started playing the track "In Vain". "Firelight", whilst having not yet been played during the tour, was played by den Adel and guitarist Stefan Helleblad alongside Jasper Steverlinck at a special event in Belgium.

A special stage design and specific costumes were elaborated by the band for the tour. The stage was ornamented with a futuristic metallic design with special stage lighting effects, projection screens, and fog machines, to intensify the exact atmosphere of the songs, especially the ones from the recurrent album. The band male members made use of special futuristic uniforms, and den Adel of a futuristic black dress, a white cloak, and a special flag for the song "Raise Your Banner". For the closing song "Stairway to the Skies", the vocalist has a change of clothing to a sparkly blue dress before being elevated on the stage by a harness in front of special white lightning and sky projections, as an allegory for the lyrics of the song. The level of special stage effects, however, changed according to the capacity of each venue of comporting them.

By the end of 2018, it was reported by the Dutch media that the first European leg of the tour had an attendance of 125,000 people.

During the COVID-19 pandemic, the band took part at the Together at Home movement, where artists made online live performances to encourage people to stay home and prevent more infection cases.

Reception

Keld Broksø from Danish magazine Gaffa was positive about the tour. In his 4 star review of the concert at the Valby-Hallen, in Copenhagen, Broksø pointed a great improvement from the band's latest concert on the country back in 2014. The reviewer pointed lead vocalist Sharon den Adel's vocal abilities as the main attraction of the concert, and considered the performances of "Faster", "The Reckoning" and "Shot in the Dark" as the highest points of the show. While stating that the more intimate songs may not work on a heavy metal festival audience, he stated that in a proper venue it can become "beautiful and atmospheric".

Dom Walsh, from English website Louder Than War was also positive in his review about the Manchester concert, praising the band's performance as a whole while also remarking den Adel's vocals and connection with the crowd. While the reviewer noted a lesser interaction from the crowd with the still unreleased songs, as people didn't know them, he pointed out The Heart of Everything songs as the highest points of the concert, as well the closing song "Stairway to the Skies". Walsh concluded his review stating that "the slick and well-choreographed show, along with the stunning visual and light display made for an excellent piece of rock theatre. Whilst there is plenty of variation in Within Temptation’s back catalogue in terms of styles; ultimately, the soaring guitars, swirling choral choirs and Adel’s inimitable style pulse through the veins of every composition."

Mark Shepley, from the also British Flick of the Finger, cited the same qualities in his 5 out of 5 starts review of the London concert, positing the "Forgiven" performance as its highest point and classifying the concert as "rock music at its most brilliant".

Berklee Groove gave a positive review about the concert at the PlayStation Theater in New York City, also praising den Adel's vocals and the blend of styles the band managed to present during the concert, stating that "the end result is a unique blend of rock, pop, industrial, and even opera at times, all of which are what make Within Temptation stand out from a host of other anthemic rock acts."

Setlist

Songs performed

Setlists

Tour dates 

 A Canceled due to religious protests against the festival.
 B Canceled due to the COVID-19 pandemic resulting in the cancellation of the 2020 editions for the festivals.

Box office

Personnel

Within Temptation 
 Sharon den Adel – vocals
 Ruud Jolie – lead guitar
 Stefan Helleblad – rhythm guitar, backing vocals
 Martijn Spierenburg – keyboards
 Jeroen van Veen – bass guitar
 Mike Coolen – drums

Guest musicians 
 Anders Fridén – featured vocals on "Raise Your Banner" on 19 March 2019
 Anneke van Giersbergen – featured vocals on "Somewhere" on 11 July 2019
 Jonas Pap – cello on "Ice Queen", "The Last Dance" and "Somewhere" on 11 July 2019
 Camila Van Der Kooij – violins on "Ice Queen", The Last Dance" and "Somewhere" on 11 July 2019
 Tarja Turunen – featured vocals on "Paradise (What About Us?)" on 13 July 2019
 Koen Stokman – rhythm guitar on 14 September 2019

References 

2018 concert tours
2019 concert tours
Within Temptation concert tours
Concert tours of Europe
Concert tours of Germany
Concert tours of the United Kingdom
Concert tours of the United States
Concert tours cancelled due to the COVID-19 pandemic